Nicobar district is one of three districts in the Indian union territory of Andaman and Nicobar Islands. The district's administrative territory encompasses all of the Nicobar Islands, which are located in the Indian Ocean, between the Bay of Bengal and the Andaman Sea. The headquarters of the district is the village of Malacca, located on the island of Car Nicobar.

The district administration is headed by a Deputy Commissioner, who in turn reports into the Lt. Governor of the Andaman and Nicobar Islands.

It is the fifth least populous district in the country (out of 640).

Etymology
Falling on the sea route between South India / Sri Lanka and South East Asia, the sailors referred it as “land of the naked” i.e. Nakkavar which is perhaps the direct precursor of the current name “Nicobar’. The medieval Arabic name ‘Lankhabatus’ is a mere mistranscription and misapprehension of “Nankakar or Nakkavar”.

History
The district was created on August 1, 1974, when it was separated off from Andaman district.

Geography

Demographics
According to the 2011 census Nicobar district has a population of 36,842, roughly equal to the nation of Liechtenstein. This gives it a ranking of 636th in India (out of a total of 640). Its population growth rate over the decade 2001-2011 was  -12.48%.	Nicobars	has a sex ratio of 	778	females for every 1000 males, and a literacy rate of 77.5%.

The district is designated as an Integrated Tribal District and is home to significant numbers of indigenous peoples (namely, the Nicobarese and the Shompen, classified as Scheduled Tribes according to the Constitution of India), who form the majority of the district's population. Because of its status as a tribal area, travel to the district is restricted to Indian nationals, and special permit restrictions apply.

The district was severely affected by the tsunami that was caused by the 2004 Indian Ocean earthquake, which led to many deaths and damaged infrastructure.

Language

Nicobarese, of the Austroasiatic language family is the most spoken language in Nicobar Islands. As of 2011 census, Nicobarese is spoken as the first language by 65.98 per cent of the district's population followed by Hindi (9.83%), Tamil (6.10%), Telugu (4.05%), Bengali (3.90%), Kurukh (3.31%), Malayalam (1.79%) and others.

Religion

Christianity is followed by majority of the people in Nicobar district. Hinduism is followed by a considerable population.

Administrative divisions
As of 2016, The Nicobar district is divided into 3 sub-divisions and 8 taluks (tehsils).

 Car Nicobar Subdivision
 Car Nicobar taluk (HQ: Malacca)
 Nancowry Subdivision
 Nancowry taluk
 Kamorta taluk
 Teressa-Chowra taluk
 Katchal taluk
 Great Nicobar Subdivision
 Little Nicobar taluk (HQ: Pulloullo)
 North Great Nicobar taluk (HQ: Afra Bay)
 South Great Nicobar taluk (HQ: Campbell Bay)

References

External links
Nicobar district official website
Nicobar district atlas

 
Districts of the Andaman and Nicobar Islands
Minority Concentrated Districts in India